Ursula Oppens (born February 2, 1944) is an American classical concert pianist and educator. She has received five Grammy Award nominations.

Biography 
Ursula Oppens was born on February 2, 1944, in New York City into a highly musical family from Jewish parents who had fled Prague in 1938. She obtained a high school diploma from the Brearley School (1961) a Bachelor of Arts degree (cum laude) from Radcliffe College (1965) and an M.S. degree from the Juilliard School (1967).  She began early piano studies with her mother Edith Oppens, a noted piano pedagogue, and went on to study with American pianist Leonard Shure.  At Juilliard she studied with Rosina Lhévinne and Felix Galimir.  In 1969 Oppens won the Gold Medal at the Busoni International Piano Competition and the Young Concert Artists competition, plus an Avery Fisher Career Grant in 1976. She served as a Founding Member of the Speculum Musicae from 1971 to 1982.  From 1994 until 2008 Oppens was on the summer faculty of the Tanglewood Music Center. She held the position of Distinguished Professor of Music at Northwestern University from 1994 to 2008, and in 2008 went on to take up a new post as Distinguished Professor of Music at the Conservatory of Music at Brooklyn College and the CUNY Graduate Center in New York City.  Oppens is a member of the American Academy of Arts and Sciences.

Work 
Ursula Oppens is renowned for her commissioning and championship of the music of American composers who were born predominantly in the early decades of the 20th century.  The following is a list of composers who have been commissioned by Oppens or who have written works for her: Carla Bley, William Bolcom, Anthony Braxton, Elliott Carter, John Corigliano, Anthony Davis, John Harbison, Julius Hemphill, M. William Karlins, Bun-Ching Lam, Tania León, Peter Lieberson, Patricia Morehead, Conlon Nancarrow, Tobias Picker, Frederic Rzewski, Allen Shawn, Alvin Singleton, Richard Teitelbaum, Francis Thorne, Joan Tower, Lois V Vierk, Amy Williams, Christian Wolff, Amnon Wolman, and Charles Wuorinen. Often such composers have credited Oppens, an acclaimed pianist in the traditional repertory, with being an invaluable pianistic influence in the creation of their music.  Oppens's command of contemporary idioms has also extended to the works of such European masters as Luciano Berio, Gyorgy Ligeti, and Witold Lutoslawski, whose Piano Concerto was given its Chicago Symphony premiere by Oppens under the baton of Erich Leinsdorf in 1994.

Recordings 
Oppens's discography includes a recording on Vanguard of Frederic Rzewski's "The People United Will Never Be Defeated" and a version on American Piano Music of Our Time of Elliott Carter's Night Fantasies.  Overall, Oppens's body of recordings—which has received four Grammy nominations to date—forms a survey of American contemporary piano music which, in addition to the aforementioned listings,  also includes the complete  piano music of Elliott Carter and John Corigliano, and compositions by John Adams, Julius Hemphill, Conlon Nancarrow and Tobias Picker, among  others. Oppens has also set to disc a group of Beethoven piano sonatas and piano pieces for the Music & Arts label. To date Oppens has recorded for the following labels: Cedille, Wergo, Music & Arts, Vanguard Classics, Mode, Montaigne, CRI, Nuevo Era, Naxos, Angel, New World, Arte Nova, Nonesuch, Albany Records, Mark Masters, Summit, Boosey & Hawkes, New World, DeNote, Watt Works, and Bridge.

Complete discography 

SOLO RECORDINGS:

 Grammy Nomination

OTHER SOLO RECORDINGS:

 Gramophone Magazine 1999 Awards Issue: Voted best 20th-Century Chamber Music Recording

RECORDINGS WITH ORCHESTRA:

CHAMBER MUSIC RECORDINGS:

Prizes and honors 
 Grammy nomination, 2011 Winging It: The Piano Music of John Corigliano
 Grammy nomination 2009  Oppens Plays Carter
 Alumna Recognition Award, Radcliffe Institute of Advanced Study 2005
 Letter of Distinction, American Music Center 2002
 Convention Artist, MTNA 2000
 Paul Fromm Award-University of Chicago 1998
 Grammy nomination 1990   American Piano Music of Our Time
 Phi Beta Kappa (honorary) 1990
 Grammy nomination 1980   Frederic Rzewski, The People United Will Never Be Defeated
 Record World Award 1979
 Avery Fisher Career Grant 1976
 Martha Baird Rockefeller Grant 1970
 Gold Medal Busoni International Piano Competition, 1969
 Diploma d'onore Accademia Chigiana 1969
 Josef Lhévinne Scholarship 1966
 National Merit Scholarship 1961

References 

http://topics.nytimes.com/topics/reference/timestopics/people/o/ursula_oppens/index.html
https://web.archive.org/web/20060418142330/http://colbertartists.com/ArtistBio.asp?ID=41
http://www.hemsingpr.com/artist/27
http://www.bcmusic.org/index.cfm?fuseaction=FacDetail&facid=106

External links 
Interview with Ursula Oppens, April 29, 1990
Colbert Artists Management Inc.

1944 births
American classical pianists
Living people
American women classical pianists
Musicians from New York City
20th-century American pianists
Jewish classical pianists
Juilliard School alumni
Radcliffe College alumni
Brearley School alumni
20th-century American women pianists
Classical musicians from New York (state)
21st-century classical pianists
21st-century American women pianists
21st-century American pianists
Brooklyn College faculty
Music & Arts artists
Cedille Records artists
Nonesuch Records artists